The Roman Catholic Diocese of Embu is a diocese located in the city of Embu in the Ecclesiastical province of Nyeri in Kenya.

History
 June 9, 1986: Established as Diocese of Embu from the Diocese of Meru

Leadership
 Bishops of Embu (Roman rite)
 Bishop John Njue (9 Jun 1986  – 9 Mar 2002), appointed Coadjutor Bishop of Nyeri; future Cardinal
 Bishop Anthony Muheria (30 Oct 2003 to 2008), appointed Bishop of Kitui
 Bishop Paul Kariuki Njiru (Since 2009)

See also
Roman Catholicism in Kenya

Sources
 GCatholic.org
 Catholic Hierarchy

Embu County
Roman Catholic dioceses in Kenya
Christian organizations established in 1986
Roman Catholic dioceses and prelatures established in the 20th century
1986 establishments in Kenya
Roman Catholic Ecclesiastical Province of Nyeri